Brian Plat (born 5 April 2000) is a Dutch professional footballer who plays as a centre-back for Eredivisie side FC Volendam.

Career
Plat played in the youth academy of FC Volendam until 2018. He played for the reserve team Jong Volendam from 2017, with whom he missed promotion from the Derde Divisie to the third-tier Tweede Divisie via play-offs in the 2017–18 season. The following season, he did manage to win promotion to the Tweede Divisie as Jong Volendam won the title in the Derde Divisie Sunday. 

On 13 October 2019, Plat made his professional debut in the first team of Volendam in a 1–1 draw at home against Den Bosch.

Career statistics

Honours
Jong Volendam
Derde Divisie – Sunday: 2018–19

References

External links

2000 births
Living people
People from Volendam
Footballers from North Holland
Dutch footballers
Association football defenders
FC Volendam players
Eerste Divisie players
Derde Divisie players
Tweede Divisie players